Khurja pottery is traditional Indian pottery work manufactured in Khurja of the Bulandshahr district in Uttar Pradesh state, India. Khurja pottery has been protected under the Geographical indication (GI) of the Agreement on Trade-Related Aspects of Intellectual Property Rights (TRIPS) agreement. It is listed at item 178 as "Khurja Pottery" of the GI Act 1999 of the Government of India with registration confirmed by the Controller General of Patents Designs and Trademarks.

History 
Origin of Khurja’s pottery work has been said with at least two different stories. In one legend, Afghan King Taimur Lung accompanied Egyptian and Syrian potters during his campaign in the Khurja region over 500 years ago. In another legend, potters had been moved to the region during Mughal Empire while another version says there we no long historical events in accordance with pottery tradition in Khurja.

However, the author of "Pottery-making Cultures and Indian Civilization" mentioned that "Khurja in Bulandshaher is one of the oldest centers for glazed pottery in India". Further mentioned, "These potters often call themselves as Multani Kumhars suggesting that their origin was Multan".

Modern-day pottery manufacture flourished in the 1940s, and the Uttar Pradesh government set up a pottery factory in 1942. Later, the factory was closed in 1946–47 due to lack of quality. In 1952, the factory was changed as Pottery Development Centre. From 1942 until now, some adoption, transformation, initiative were taken by various actors for the betterment of pottery manufacture that resulted an importance role of Khurja pottery in national level as well as export to foreign countries.

Production 
There are about 15,000 people as official employees while about 25,000 unofficial employees who work in 500-odd units and nearly 400 factories. They produce several kinds of items such as crockery wares, art wares, electrical goods, sanitary wares, tiles, household items, etc.

Khurja pottery has market in India and foreign countries. There are nearly 23 export oriented units. Reports say that production has received around 2,500 million Indian Rupees worth of item in 1999–2000 including 148.2 million Indian Rupees worth of export.

See also 
 List of Geographical Indications in India

References 

Indian pottery
Artistic techniques
Geographical indications in Uttar Pradesh
Khurja